William Harrison Gest (January 7, 1838 – August 9, 1912) was a U.S. Representative from Illinois.

Born in Jacksonville, Illinois, Gest moved with his parents to Rock Island in 1842.
He was graduated from Williams College, Williamstown, Massachusetts, in 1860.
He studied law.
He was admitted to the bar in 1862 and commenced practice in Rock Island, Illinois.

Gest was elected as a Republican to the Fiftieth and Fifty-first Congresses (March 4, 1887 – March 3, 1891).
He was an unsuccessful candidate for reelection in 1890 to the Fifty-second Congress.
Circuit judge of the fourteenth judicial district of Illinois from June 1897 until his death in Rock Island, Illinois, August 9, 1912.
He was interred in Chippiannock Cemetery.

References

1838 births
1912 deaths
Politicians from Jacksonville, Illinois
Politicians from Rock Island, Illinois
Williams College alumni
Illinois state court judges
Republican Party members of the United States House of Representatives from Illinois
19th-century American politicians
19th-century American judges